The 2008 World Indoor Bowls Championships  was held at Potters Leisure Resort, Hopton on Sea, Great Yarmouth, England, from 08-27 January 2008. The event was sponsored by Potters Holidays.

Alex Marshall won the men's singles defeating Ian Bond in the final achieving a record fifth title. Despite the fact that a women's singles tournament was held Ceri Ann Davies also competed in the men's singles competition, and became the first woman to win matches in the final stages of the event with victories over Glenn Skipp in the preliminary round, and Jamie Hill in the first round.

Winners

Draw and results

Men's singles

Men's Pairs

Women's singles

Mixed Pairs

References

External links
Official website

World Indoor Bowls Championship
2008 in bowls